Harlequin Dome is a granite dome, quite near Tenaya Lake, in the Tuolumne Meadows region of Yosemite National Park.

Finding Harlequin Dome

From the parking lot at Tenaya Lake, cross Highway 120, hike up slabs to a short headwall. Continue up the trail to the base of the cliff.

Harlequin Dome is directly across from Pywiack Dome.

Rock climbing

On Harlequin Dome Jim Bridwell and Roger Breedlove climbed Hoodwink, creating that upside-down feeling.

Harlequin Dome is south-facing, so warm, and is also steep. It has one-to-three pitch climbs, but the climbs wander a bit, and the approach is easier.

References

External links and references

 Chinese Handcuffs, Harlequin Dome 5.10d 	    
 A YouTube

Granite domes of Yosemite National Park